Gisela Trowe (5 September 1922 in Dortmund – 5 April 2010 in Hamburg) was a German actress and voice actress.

Selected filmography 
 1948: Street Acquaintances
 1948: The Time with You
 1948: 
 1948: Affaire Blum
 1951: The Lost One
 1952: Under the Thousand Lanterns
 1953: Not Afraid of Big Animals
 1956: Damals in Paris
 1957: Goodbye, Franziska
 1957: Wo du hingehst
 1960: I Learned That in Paris
 1963: 
 1969: Eika Katappa
 1969: Argila
 1970:  (TV miniseries)
 1971: The Bordello
 1980: Teegebäck und Platzpatronen (TV film)
 1981: Alles im Eimer
 1987:  (TV film)
 1987–2008: Der Landarzt (TV series, 67 episodes)
 1988: Die Bertinis (TV miniseries)
 1991: Großstadtrevier: Gelegenheit macht Diebe (TV)
 1992: Kommissar Klefisch: Ein unbekannter Zeuge (TV)
 1992/1999: Unser Lehrer Doktor Specht (TV series, 52 episodes)
 1997: Babes' Petrol
 2000: Cold Is the Evening Breeze
 2001: Die Braut meines Freundes (TV film)
 2003: Gestern gibt es nicht (TV film)
 2006: Mütter, Väter, Kinder (TV film)
 2007: In aller Freundschaft: Heimlichkeiten (TV)
 2009: Für immer Venedig (TV film)
 2009:

References

External links 
 Literature about Gisela Trowe in the catalog of the German National Library
 Pictures of Gisela Trowe in the Virtual History
Gisela Trowe at the German Dubbing Card Index

1922 births
2010 deaths
Actors from Dortmund
Actresses from Hamburg
German film actresses
German television actresses
German voice actresses
20th-century German actresses
21st-century German actresses